Psycho City is the sixth studio album by the American hard rock band Great White, released in 1992. It was the last studio album produced for Capitol Records, with the exception of the 1993 compilation The Best of Great White: 1986–1992. It was reissued in 1999 by French label Axe Killer with four bonus tracks.

Track listing

Personnel 
Jack Russell – lead and backing vocals
Mark Kendall – guitar, backing vocals
Michael Lardie – guitar, keyboards, percussion, backing vocals, producer, arranger, engineer
Audie Desbrow – drums

Additional musicians 
Alan Niven – backing vocals, percussion, producer, arranger
Dave "The Beast" Spitz – bass
Richie Gajate Garcia – percussion
Rick Brewster – guitar

Production 
Melissa Sewell, Micajah Ryan – engineers
Paul Wertheimer – assistant engineer
George Marino – mastering

Charts

Album

Singles 

Big Goodbye

Old Rose Motel

References 

Great White albums
1992 albums
Capitol Records albums